Chapter One: Blue (stylized in all lowercase) is the second extended play (EP) by American singer Bea Miller. It was released on February 24, 2017 by Hollywood Records. Two more "chapters" (EPs) were released during 2017 as part of her second album,  Chapter Two: Red, released on June 2, 2017 and Chapter Three: Yellow on October 6, 2017. On February 23, 2018, the full album Aurora was released including all the songs of the three previous EPs, plus five new tracks.

Singles 
The first track "Song Like You" was released as the lead single from Chapter One: Blue and was sent to mainstream radio on March 14, 2017.

Track listing 

Notes
 signifies a co-producer

Personnel 
Credits adapted from Qobuz.

Jorge Gutiérrez – assistant recording engineer
James "Gladius" Wong – background vocals, composer, piano, producer, programming
Trevor "Trevorious" Brown – composer, co-producer, songwriter
Warren "Oak" Feder – composer, engineer, producer, songwriter
Steph Jones – composer, songwriter
Julia Michaels – composer, songwriter
Bea Miller – composer, songwriter, vocals
William Simons – composer, songwriter
Ido Zmishlany – composer, engineer, producer, songwriter
Zaire Koalo – co-producer
Phil English – engineer
Chris Gehringer – mastering
Erik Madrid – mixing
Michel Heyaca – producer

Release history

References 

2017 EPs
Bea Miller albums
Hollywood Records EPs
EPs by American artists
Albums produced by Oak Felder